The Astoria Wharf and Warehouse Company building is a historic warehouse located in Astoria, Oregon, United States.

The building was listed on the National Register of Historic Places in 1984.

See also
National Register of Historic Places listings in Clatsop County, Oregon

References

External links

1892 establishments in Oregon
Commercial buildings completed in 1892
Industrial buildings and structures on the National Register of Historic Places in Oregon
National Register of Historic Places in Astoria, Oregon
Warehouses on the National Register of Historic Places